Duisburg-Großenbaum station is a station in the district of Großenbaum of the city of Duisburg in the German state of North Rhine-Westphalia. It is on the Cologne–Duisburg railway and it is classified by Deutsche Bahn as a category 5 station. The station was opened on 9 February 1846 as Großenbaum. It was renamed Duisburg-Großenbaum on 14 May 1950. A station building was built in 1856, but it is now used as a cafe, called Gleis drei (track three).

The station is served by Rhine-Ruhr S-Bahn line S 1 (Dortmund–Solingen) every 20 minutes during the day on week days, every 30 minutes on weekends between Essen and Düsseldorf.

It is also served by three bus routes operated by Duisburger Verkehrsgesellschaft at 30-minute intervals: 934, 940 and 941.

References

Rhine-Ruhr S-Bahn stations
S1 (Rhine-Ruhr S-Bahn)
Buildings and structures in Duisburg
Transport in Duisburg
Railway stations in Germany opened in 1846
1846 establishments in Prussia